Edmund Zivanai Chipamaunga (1938–2019) was a Zimbabwean writer and diplomat. He was the first Zimbabwean ambassador to the United States between 1982 and 1985. He was then transferred to Kenya where he served until 1992. After Zimbabwe's independence in 1980, Chipamaunga was one of the writers who started exploring the experiences of black freedom fighters in the country's liberation struggle.

Bibliography 
 A Fighter for Freedom (Mambo Press, 1983)
 Chains of Freedom (Zimbabwe Publishing House, 1998)
 Feeding Freedom (Mercury Press, 2000)
 New Roots (Progressive Publishers, 2018)

References

1938 births
2019 deaths
Zimbabwean diplomats
Zimbabwean writers